Langdon's Legacy is a lost 1916 silent comedy-drama film directed by Otis Turner and starring J. Warren Kerrigan and Lois Wilson. It was produced and distributed by Universal Film Manufacturing Company.

Cast
J. Warren Kerrigan as Jack Langdon
Bertram Grassby as Juan Maria Barada
Lois Wilson as Pepita
Maude George as Senorita Del Deros
Harry Carter as Miguel Alba
George A. Williams as Mr. Thompson
Mae Talbot as Mrs. Thompson
Vera Sisson (unconfirmed)
George Periolat (unconfirmed)

References

External links

1916 films
Films directed by Otis Turner
Lost American films
American black-and-white films
Universal Pictures films
American comedy-drama films
1916 comedy-drama films
1916 lost films
Lost comedy-drama films
1910s American films
1910s English-language films